The 2012 UCI World Tour was the fourth edition of the ranking system launched by the Union Cycliste Internationale (UCI) in 2009. The series started with the Tour Down Under's opening stage on 17 January, and consisted of 14 stage races, 14 one-day races, and one team time trial (which only counted towards the team rankings). The Tour of Hangzhou which was originally included in the list of races was postponed until 2013.


Teams

The 18 UCI ProTeams competed in the World Tour, with UCI Professional Continental teams, or national squads, able to enter at the discretion of the organisers of each event. The ProTeams, which were obliged to take part in all 29 events, were:

A change in sponsorship saw  become , while 2011's  became .

Events
All 27 events from the 2011 UCI World Tour were included, and E3 Harelbeke, a one-day race in Belgium, and the World Team Trial Championships, were added.

† The World Team Time Trial Championship gives points only in the team rankings, not in the individual or national standings.

Final standings

Individual
Source:

Riders tied with the same number of points were classified by number of victories, then number of second places, third places, and so on, in World Tour events and stages.

 248 riders scored points. 40 other riders finished in positions that would have earned them points, but they were ineligible as members of non-ProTour teams.

Team
Source:

Team rankings were calculated by adding the ranking points of the top five riders of a team in the table, plus points gained in the World Team Time Trial Championship (WTTT).

Nation
Source:

National rankings were calculated by adding the ranking points of the top five riders registered in a nation in the table. The national rankings as of the 21st event, Clásica de San Sebastián, were used to determine how many riders a country could have in the World Championships.

 Riders from 35 countries scored points.

Leader Progress

References

 
UCI World Tour
2012 in road cycling